Trapped on Cleveland 3 is the second studio album by American rapper Lil Keed. It was released on August 7, 2020, by YSL Records and 300 Entertainment. It is the third and final installment of the Trapped on Cleveland mixtape series, but this is an album. The album features guest appearances from Young Thug, Gunna, Lil Baby, Travis Scott, Ty Dolla Sign, 42 Dugg, and Future. The deluxe edition was released on October 30, 2020. It features additional guest appearances from Lil Gotit, O.T. Genasis, Quavo, Yak Gotti, Lil Duke, and Chris Brown. This would be the final project released in Lil Keed's lifetime, as he died on May 13, 2022.

Background
Trapped on Cleveland 3 is the first of the series in which it was released as an album on streaming platforms. Keed commented on his growth throughout the years by stating,

Singles
The album's lead and only single, "Fox 5" featuring American rapper and fellow labelmate Gunna, was released on June 12, 2020. It was accompanied by a music video, the following day. "She Know", featuring American rapper Lil Baby, was released on August 3, 2020, as a promotional single. "Show Me What You Got", featuring American rapper O.T. Genasis, was released on October 16, 2020, as the lead and only single for the deluxe edition.

Track listing
Credits adapted from BMI, Tidal, and Geoff Ogunlesi's Instagram.

Notes
  signifies a co-producer
  signifies an uncredited co-producer

Personnel
Credits adapted from Tidal and Geoff Ogunlesi's Instagram.

Performers
 Lil Keed – primary artist 
 Young Thug – featured artist 
 Gunna – featured artist 
 Lil Baby – featured artist 
 Travis Scott – featured artist 
 Ty Dolla Sign – featured artist 
 42 Dugg – featured artist 
 Future – featured artist 
 Lil Gotit – featured artist 
 O.T. Genasis – featured artist 
 Quavo – featured artist 
 Yak Gotti – featured artist 
 Lil Duke – featured artist 
 Chris Brown – featured artist 

Technical
 Senor Slice – recording 
 Anthony "Dub" Williams – recording 
 Angad "Bainz" Bains – recording , mixing 
 Florian "Flo" Ongonga – recording 
 James "Murk Tha Engineer" Butler- recording

 Rafael "Fai" Bautista – recording , mixing 
 Bryan Anzel – recording 
 Eric Manco – recording 
 Aresh Banaji – mixing , mixing assistant 
 Alex Tumay – mixing 
 Mike Dean – co-mixing 
 Drew Sliger – mixing assistant 
 Jenso "JP" Plymouth – mixing assistant 
 Nathan Miller – mixing assistant 
 Christal Jerez – mixing assistant 
 Travis "ViKo" Blake – mixing assistant 
 Joe LaPorta – mastering

Charts

References

2020 albums
Lil Keed albums
YSL Records albums
Albums produced by JetsonMade
Albums produced by T-Minus (record producer)
Albums produced by Wheezy